Enterocloster asparagiformis, formerly Clostridium asparagiforme, is a Gram-positive, obligately anaerobic and rod-shaped bacterium. It was isolated from human faeces in Germany.

References

 

Bacteria described in 2007
Lachnospiraceae